The Australian Presbyterian Mission was founded by the Presbyterian Church of Australia to reach those "beyond the farthest fence" with God's Word. It is better known as the Australian Inland Mission (AIM). Rev. John Flynn was the first superintendent possessing a vision and dedication to see that "hospital and nursing facilities are provided within a hundred miles of every spot in Australia where women and children reside".

From 1912 the Australian Inland Mission established 15 nursing homes/bush hospitals in remote Australian locations including some offices/shelters 
Following the establishment of the Uniting Church in Australia in 1977, the work of the AIM continued in the Presbyterian Church as the Presbyterian Inland Mission and in the Uniting Church as Frontier Services.

The mission's centennial was celebrated in 2012.
There is a Rev. John Flynn Memorial in Moliagul, Victoria.

References

External links
 Australian Inland Mission collection - digitised images from the National Library of Australia
 Frontier Services homepage
 PIM homepage

Uniting Church in Australia
Presbyterian Church of Australia
Medical and health organisations based in Australia
Christian missions in Oceania
Organizations established in 1912
1912 establishments in Australia